Órla, Orlaith, Orla or Orlagh (pronounced OR-lah) is a given name of Celtic origin. The root form of the name is Órfhlaith, interpretable as "golden princess" as it combines the Gaelic elements ór ("gold") and fhlaith (literally "prince"), its full feminine form being banfhlaith.

Well known via association with Brian Boru, whose sister Órlaith íngen Cennétig (d. 941) was queen consort to the Irish High King Donnchad Donn, Órflaith (however spelled) was the fourth-most frequently recorded female name in the annals of 12th century Ireland; after a long period of obscurity, the name—in both the Órlaith and Órla forms—became popular in the late 20th century, not only in Ireland but also in Scotland, despite the name not having a Scottish heritage. 

It is quite common, even in Ireland, to see the name written as Orla without the vowel-lengthening fada accent on the "o".

Orla is also a male given name in the Danish language and has been used as a unisex name in the Norwegian, Finnish and German language. 

Orla is also a short form of the name Orsola, which is a variant of Ursula.

Historical figures
 Órlaith íngen Cennétig, Queen of Ireland, died 941
 Órlaith Ní Maoil Seachnaill, Queen of Mide, died 1066 
 Órlaith Nic Cennétich, died 1104. The ship LÉ Orla is named after her.
 Órlaith Ní Mael Sechlainn, Queen of Connacht, died 1115
 Órlaith Ní Diarmata, Princess of Moylurg, died 1252
 Órlaith Ní Conchobair, Princess of Connacht and Abbess, died 1283
 Orla Jørgensen, Danish male Olympic gold medalist in 1928
 Orla Hyllested, Danish union representative and politician

Broadcasters
 Orla Barry, Irish radio presenter of Weekend Blend on NewsTalk Radio, a Dublin-based station
 Orla Guerin, Irish correspondent for BBC Africa
 Orla Ní Fhinneadha, Irish television presenter on TG4
 Orla Rapple,  Irish broadcaster, she has worked for City Channel, Beat 102/103, AA Roadwatch and Seoige and O'Shea.

Arts and media
 Orla Brady, Irish actress; her most notable and critically acclaimed work was the 1999 film A Love Divided
 Orlagh Cassidy, American actress
 Órla Fallon, Irish singer, songwriter, and harpist. She was a member of Celtic Woman from 2005 to 2009. 
 Orla Fitzgerald, Irish actress
 Órfhlaith Flynn, was one of the members of the musical group Anúna
 Orla Gartland, Irish singer
 Orla Kiely graduated from The National College of Art and Design in Dublin, and continued her education with a master's degree at the Royal College of Art in London. Her trademark leaf pattern used in her handbag design has become a highly recognisable international brand. Her collection now spans womenswear, accessories, wallpaper, homewares and stationery, plus a collection of notepaper for Tate Modern.
 Orlaith McAllister, Northern Irish glamour model and former Big Brother contestant
 Orla O'Rourke, Irish actress
 Orla O'Shea, Irish singer
 Orlaith Rafter, Irish actor and writer
 Orla Tobin (Rose of Tralee), singer, winner of the 2003 Rose of Tralee contest
 Orla Wolf, German writer, artist and filmmaker

Sports 
 Orla Noom, professional squash player from the Netherlands
 Orla O'Doherty, professional squash player from Ireland
 Orla Walsh, Irish track cyclist

Other
 Orla Lehmann, Danish statesman
 Orla Møller (1916–1979), Danish priest and politician
 Órlaithí Flynn, member of the Northern Ireland Assembly
 Orla, Italian organ maker
 Órfhlaith Begley, MP in the UK Parliament for West Tyrone

Fictional characters
 Orla McCool, from the sitcom Derry Girls
 Orla Healy, from the television drama Three Families
 Orla Sargent, from the young adult books The Raven Cycle
 Agent Orla, from the educational television series Odd Squad
 Orla, from the novel The Sopranos and its film adaptation Our Ladies
 Orla, male protagonist of the 19th century German emancipation drama Orla by Albert Dulk

See also

References 

 
 

Celtic given names
Danish masculine given names
Irish feminine given names